Peggy Orenstein (born November 22, 1961) is the author of the New York Times bestsellers Boys & Sex, Girls & Sex, Cinderella Ate My Daughter and Waiting for Daisy, as well as Don’t Call Me Princess, Flux, and the classic Schoolgirls. Her TED talk has been viewed over 5.5 million times.   

A frequent contributor to the New York Times Magazine, she was named in 2012  by The Columbia Journalism Review as one of its "40 Women Who Changed the Media Business in the Past 40 Years".

Writing
In books and magazine articles Peggy Orenstein writes about the politics of every day life, usually relating to gender. Her book Schoolgirls was groundbreaking in its discussion of educational inequity. In Flux she explored the life choices of a generation of ethnically diverse, middle class women in their mid-20s to mid-40s.  Waiting for Daisy was her memoir of infertility, cancer and motherhood. In Cinderella Ate My Daughter she exposed the “girlie girl” culture being marketed to young children. Girls & Sex and Boys & Sex broke silences around teenage sexual behavior, sexualized media, and hookup culture calling for healthier, open dialogue between parents and children as well as expanded positive-based sex and relationship education in schools. She has also written extensively about breast cancer and the limits of mammographic screening and early detection

Recognition
Orenstein has been named by the Columbia Journalism Review "40 women who changed the media business in the past 40 years." 

She has also been recognized by the "Council on Contemporary Families for her "Outstanding Coverage of Family Diversity.”

She has received two “Books for a Better Life” awards.

Her magazine work has also been honored by the Commonwealth Club of California, the National Women’s Political Caucus of California and Planned Parenthood Federation of America.

She was the recipient of fellowships from the United States-Japan Foundation and the Asian Cultural Council.

Selected works
 SchoolGirls: Young Women, Self-Esteem and the Confidence Gap. New York: Random House, 1994. , 
 Flux: Women on Sex, Work, Kids, Love and Life in a Half-Changed World  	New York : Anchor Books, 2001. , 
 Waiting for Daisy New York: Bloomsbury, 2007. , 
 Cinderella Ate My Daughter New York, NY : Harper, 2012. , 
 Girls & Sex New York, NY: Harper, 2016. , 
 Don't Call Me Princess: Essays on Girls, Women, Sex, and Life. Harper Paperbacks, 2018. , 
 Boys & Sex: Young Men on Hookups, Love, Porn, Consent, and Navigating the New Masculinity, 2020.

References

External links

"The Divine Sisterhood", The Columbia Journalism Review, July 2012.

Living people
1961 births
Writers from Minneapolis
Oberlin College alumni
American feminist writers
American memoirists
American women writers
Jewish American writers
Writers from Minnesota
Writers from the San Francisco Bay Area
American women memoirists
American women journalists
21st-century American Jews
21st-century American women